Ceratoporthe is a genus of fungi within the Melanconidaceae family.

References

External links
Ceratoporthe at Index Fungorum

Melanconidaceae